State Road 145 is a north–south road in the southwest portion of the U.S. State of Indiana.

Route description
It runs north through the small towns of Bristow and Sassafras, and intersects Interstate 64 at exit 72 at Kitterman Corners. It then strikes north again through the forest and across Patoka Lake, and terminates in French Lick at State Road 56.

Major intersections

References

External links

145
Transportation in Perry County, Indiana
Transportation in Crawford County, Indiana
Transportation in Orange County, Indiana
Transportation in Dubois County, Indiana